Saint-Amand may refer to:

People
Saint-Amand (writer) (1797–1885), French playwright
Alphée Saint-Amand (1903–1983), Canadian politician and businessman
Mario Saint-Amand (born 1968), Canadian singer and actor

Places

Belgium
Saint-Amand, Fleurus, a village in Hainaut
Sint-Amands, a municipality in the province of Antwerp

France
Saint-Amand, Creuse
Saint-Amand, Manche
Saint-Amand, Pas-de-Calais
Saint-Amand-de-Belvès, in the Dordogne department
Saint-Amand-de-Coly, in the Dordogne department
Saint-Amand-des-Hautes-Terres, in the Eure department
Saint-Amand-de-Vergt, in the Dordogne department
Saint-Amand-en-Puisaye, in the Nièvre department
Saint-Amand-Jartoudeix, in the Creuse department
Saint-Amand-le-Petit, in the Haute-Vienne department
Saint-Amand-les-Eaux, in the Nord department
Saint-Amand-Longpré, in the Loir-et-Cher department
Saint-Amand-Magnazeix, in the Haute-Vienne department
Saint-Amand-Montrond, in the Cher department
Saint-Amand-sur-Fion, in the Marne department
Saint-Amand-sur-Ornain, in the Meuse department
Saint-Amand-sur-Sèvre, in the Deux-Sèvres department

Other uses
 Saint-Amand Abbey, Saint-Amand-les-Eaux, Nord, France

See also
Saint Amand, 7th-century saint
Saint-Amant (disambiguation)
Saint-Amans (disambiguation)